The Circuito do Estoril or Autódromo do Estoril (Estoril Circuit), officially known as Autódromo Fernanda Pires da Silva, is a motorsport race track on the Portuguese Riviera, outside of Lisbon, owned by state-run holding management company Parpública. It was the home of the Formula One Portuguese Grand Prix from 1984 to 1996. The capacity of the motorsport stadium is 45,000. The circuit has an FIA Grade 1 license.

History
The current Estoril circuit was built and completed in 1972 on a rocky plateau near the village of Alcabideche,  from Estoril, the town lending its name to the circuit. The course has two hairpin turns, noticeable elevation changes, and a long  start/finish straight. Monsanto Park, another street circuit in Lisbon hosted a variety of motor racing events in the 1950s, including the 1959 Portuguese Grand Prix, an event it shared briefly with the Boavista street circuit in Porto.

Its first years saw many national races, as well as an occasional Formula 2 race. However, the course soon fell into disrepair due to the owning company having been taken over by the state between 1975 and 1978, and a significant redevelopment effort was needed before international motorsport returned in 1984. In the 1980s, the Rally de Portugal also had a special stage at the circuit.

Estoril became a popular event on the F1 calendar, the setting for many well-known moments including Niki Lauda winning the  championship, his third and final, from McLaren teammate Alain Prost by just half a point by finishing second to Prost at the 1984 Portuguese Grand Prix; three-time world champion Ayrton Senna's first F1 win in 1985; Nigel Mansell's notorious black flag incident and subsequent collision with Senna in 1989; Riccardo Patrese being launched airborne in a near-backward flip after colliding with Gerhard Berger on the main straight in 1992; and Jacques Villeneuve overtaking Michael Schumacher around the outside of the final turn in 1996.

Throughout the years, Estoril has had numerous problems with safety, failing safety inspections on more than one occasion. Estoril sometimes has strong winds. Many teams were fond of using Estoril for winter testing.

Estoril was dropped from the F1 calendar for the 1997 season, though it continued to play host to top-level single-seater, sports car and touring car events, including the FIA GT Championship, the DTM and the World Series by Renault.

On 3 September 2000, the Autódromo do Estoril held its first Portuguese motorcycle Grand Prix, an event held annually. On 23 October 2005, the circuit hosted the third round of the first ever A1 Grand Prix racing season, with both races in the event being won by the French team. The track hosted Superleague Formula series events in 2008 and 2009.

In 2020, due to rescheduling of major international sport series due to COVID-19 pandemic, Estoril hosted the final race of 2020 Superbike World Championship (after hosting the series in 1988 and 1993) and the final race of 2019–20 FIM Endurance World Championship (after hosting the series in 1987 and 2000).

Lap records 

As of January 2023, the fastest official race lap records at the Circuito do Estoril are listed as:

Events

 Current

 January: GT Winter Series
 May: FIM CEV Moto2 European Championship, FIM CEV Moto3 Junior World Championship, European Talent Cup
 June: Campeonato de España de Superbike
 July: 24H Series 12 Hours of Estoril, Ferrari Challenge Europe
 October: Sidecar World Championship, Eurocup-3, F4 Spanish Championship, TCR Spain Touring Car Championship, Estoril Classics
 November: SuperCars Endurance Series 250 km Estoril

 Former

 A1 Grand Prix (2005)
 Auto GP (2004, 2014)
 Deutsche Tourenwagen Masters (2004)
 Euroformula Open (2005–2007, 2015–2018, 2022)
 European Formula Two Championship (1975–1977)
 European Le Mans Series 4 Hours of Estoril (2011, 2014–2016)
 European Touring Car Championship (1977–1978, 1985–1988, 2001–2003)
 European Touring Car Cup (2006)
 European Truck Racing Championship (2003)
 FIA GT Championship (2000–2003)
 FIA Sportscar Championship FIA Sportscar Championship Estoril (2002–2003)
 FIM Endurance World Championship 12 Hours of Estoril (1987, 2000, 2020–2021)
 Formula Chrysler Euroseries (2001)
 Formula 3 Euro Series (2004)
 Formula One Portuguese Grand Prix (1984–1996)
 Formula Renault Eurocup (2005, 2007–2008, 2016)
 Grand Prix motorcycle racing Portuguese motorcycle Grand Prix (2000–2012)
 IMSA European Le Mans Series ''Estoril 1000km (2001)
 International Formula 3000 (1985, 1994–1996)
 International GT Open (2006, 2008, 2015–2018, 2022)
 International Touring Car Championship (1995–1996)
 Porsche Cup Brasil (2011–2012, 2014, 2019)
 Porsche Supercup (1994, 1996)
 Stock Car Brasil (1982)
 Superbike World Championship (1988, 1993, 2020–2022)
 Superleague Formula (2008–2009)
 TCR International Series (2016)
 World Touring Car Championship FIA WTCC Race of Portugal (2008)
 World Touring Car Cup FIA WTCR Race of Portugal (2021)

Major event winners

Motorcycling - Portuguese Grand Prix

Notes

References

External links 

Satellite picture at Google Maps.

Audio walkthrough of the track, for use with games.

Estoril
Estoril
Estoril
Estoril
Estoril
Estoril
Estoril
Rally de Portugal
Circuito do Estoril
Circuito do Estoril
Circuito do Estoril
Circuito do Estoril